Deliathis nivea is a species of beetle in the family Cerambycidae. It was described by Henry Walter Bates in 1869. It is known from Nicaragua, Guatemala, Costa Rica, Honduras, and Panama.

Varietas
 Deliathis nivea var. detersa Bates, 1885
 Deliathis nivea var. femelle Bates, 1885
 Deliathis nivea var. inermis Aurivillius, 1922

References

Lamiini
Beetles described in 1869
Taxa named by Henry Walter Bates
Beetles of Central America